Nematullah Shahrani (born 1941) is a prominent Afghan scholar. He was one of four Vice Presidents of the Afghan Transitional Administration from 2002 to 2004. Shahrani also headed of the Afghan Constitution Commission.

He has written more than 30 books and several hundred academic articles. He belongs to an academic family that is known in Afghanistan as the family of scholars. He studied at Kabul University, Al-Azhar University (Cairo) and The George Washington University (U.S.).

From Badakhshan Province in northern Afghanistan, Shahrani is ethnically Uzbek. Although he was one of the ideological figures behind the Afghan resistance against the Soviet invasion of Afghanistan, he was never involved in any sectarian, party and other ethnic conflicts in Afghanistan. For that he earned the nickname of Mr. Clean.

Currently some of his other family members are teaching at academic institutions in the United States (such as Indiana University Bloomington) and the United Kingdom.

References 

Afghan academics
Vice presidents of Afghanistan
Government ministers of Afghanistan
Living people
1941 births
Al-Azhar University alumni
George Washington University alumni
Date of birth missing (living people)